Guy Wilkie Warren  (born 16 April 1921) is an Australian painter who won the Archibald Prize in 1985 with Flugelman with Wingman. His works have also been exhibited as finalists in the Dobell Prize and he received the Trustees Watercolour Award at the Wynne Prize in 1980. He turned 100 in 2021.

Career

Military service 
Warren (Service number NX110908) served in the Australian Army during World War II from 15 May 1941 until 3 April 1946. During his service outside Australia in New Guinea and Bougainville Island with the 136 Advance Supply Depot he rose to the rank of Staff Sergeant.

Many of Warren's creative influences can be traced to his Army service. An experience of the jungle at Canungra in southeast Queensland, which was reinforced during his service in New Guinea became a constant theme throughout his career.

Artistic career 
At the end of World War II, Warren undertook art training at the National Art School. During this time, Warren met other veteran artists who had also served in World War II, and who took advantage of the Commonwealth's post war training scheme. On completing this program, Warren travelled to England to pursue landscape painting where a chance meeting with a young veteran and naturalist, Sir David Attenborough, provided the opportunity to continue his passion for the jungle through photos Sir David provided from his own travels to New Guinea.

Warren has been the subject of numerous solo exhibitions. In 2016, the S. H. Ervin Gallery held Genesis of a painter: Guy Warren at 95, which focussed on works from the 1950s and 60s together with works painted late in his life. The intention of the exhibition was to show Warren's "enduring imagery of the relationship between the figure and background". At least two exhibitions were held at the time of his hundredth birthday, From the Mountain to the Sky,  held by the National Art School; and Hills and Wings: A Celebration of Guy Warren and his Work, at the University of Wollongong, where he was previously the director of the University's art collection.

As an artist's subject 
Warren has been a sitter for portraits on several occasions, including for four or five artists painting for Australia's premier portraiture competition, the Archibald Prize. In the early 2000s he posed for Ann Cape, for her work Figure within the landscape: Guy Warren, that hung in the 2004 prize exhibition. Then in 2021, the 100th year of the Archibald Prize, painter Peter Wegner won the award for his portrait of Warren – who was, like the prize, in his hundredth year.

Honours and awards 
Warren was awarded the Medal of the Order of Australia in 1999 and was made a Member of the Order of Australia for "significant service to the visual arts as a painter, teacher, mentor and competition judge" in 2014.

References

External links 
Guy Warren works in the University of Wollongong Library
Guy Warren works held in the University of Wollongong Art Collection

Australian painters
Australian centenarians
Archibald Prize winners
Living people
Men centenarians
1921 births
Members of the Order of Australia
Australian Army personnel of World War II
Australian Army soldiers